Huai Yot railway station is a railway station located in Huai Yot Subdistrict, Huai Yot District, Trang. The station opened in April 1913, on the Southern Line section Kantang–Huai Yot.

Train services 
 Express train No. 83 / 84 Bangkok–Trang–Bangkok
 Rapid train No. 167 / 168 Bangkok–Kantang–Bangkok

References 
 
 

Railway stations in Thailand